Blötberget is a locality situated in Ludvika Municipality, Dalarna County, Sweden with 428 inhabitants in 2010.

Blötberget is part of the Ludvika Mines, and lies in the Bergslagen mineral district of central Sweden. Bergslagen is known for the significant content of high-quality iron-oxide occurrences and historically has contributed to the Swedish economy and well-being for over 800 years.

References 

Populated places in Dalarna County
Populated places in Ludvika Municipality